The Travis Air Force Base Aviation Museum (former names include Travis Air Museum, Jimmy Doolittle Air & Space Museum, and Travis Air Force Base Heritage Center) is an aviation museum located at Travis Air Force Base in Fairfield, California.  The museum houses 35+ aircraft displays and various other informative artifacts.

History
In 1982, at the request of Col Tony Burshnick, Commander, 60th Military Airlift Wing, Travis Air Force Base and a group of aviation enthusiasts, most of whom are retired Air Force members, established the Travis Air Force Base Historical Society, a non-profit, tax-exempt organization, for the purpose of creating an air museum on base.  The following year, the Travis Air Museum was established with the approval of the Secretary of the Air Force and Public Affairs, albeit with no facility. The mission of the museum was to help preserve the heritage of the Air Force, the history of Travis Air Force Base and airlift in the Pacific. The Society then began a vigorous campaign to obtain aircraft and other artifacts for the museum.  When the old commissary on base was vacated in 1986, Col John Tait, Commander, 60th Military Airlift Wing, Travis Air Force Base, made it available to house the accumulated artifacts.  Within a year, Travis Air Force Base museum officially became the Travis Air Museum.

In 1989, the museum planned to recover the B-17 Swamp Ghost from Papua New Guinea.

In the spring of 2001, with the blessing of the Jimmy Doolittle family and Lieutenant General Ronald C. Marcotte, Vice Commander, Air Mobility Command, the foundation's request to rename the new Travis Air Force Base Museum in honor of the late General (Ret) James H. Doolittle was approved.

In the spring of 2003, the 61st Doolittle Raider Reunion was hosted by the Travis Air Force Base Museum, the Jimmy Doolittle Air and Space Museum Foundation and local communities.

Future expansion plans
During 2000, the museum working group determined that a new Travis Air Force Base museum was not only necessary, but was also in the best interests of both the Air Force and the local community.  A new site was identified: some 16 acres near the Travis Air Force Base hospital. The Campaign for the "Aviation Museum of the New Millennium" began and an artist's conception of the new museum building was created.

After the September 11, 2001 attacks, security changes on base and other considerations resulted in a search for another base site.

From 2004 to 2009, guidance and advice on the challenges of building a new museum were obtained from many sources, in particular the National Air and Space Museum in Washington, D.C., the Strategic Air and Space Museum in Omaha, Nebraska, the Museum of Flight in Seattle, Washington and the Museum of Aviation at Robins Air Force Base, Georgia.

In the spring of 2010, Colonel James C. Vechery, Commander, 60th Air Mobility Wing, Travis Air Force Base officially confirmed that a parcel of property on Travis Air Force Base accessible to the general public would be the home of a new Air Force-owned and operated Air Museum.

In April 2011, the foundation had raised approximately $1 million of the required $34+ million.  Many companies and persons have donated, including Jelly Belly Candy Company, which is headquartered in Fairfield, California, and an endorsement by actor Tom Hanks. In July 2011, a new design plan for the proposed expansion was released by the fundraising committee, Wings of Valor Capital Campaign.

As of 2014, the foundation has found a lot near the Nut Tree Airport. This area will give the military and non-military public a chance to view the history of the collection.

Exhibits

Outdoor aircraft park

 Beechcraft AT-11 Kansan
 Beechcraft C-45H Expeditor
 Boeing B-29 Superfortress
 Boeing B-52D Stratofortress
 Cessna U-3A
 Convair C-131D Samaritan
 Convair F-102A Delta Dagger
 de Havilland Canada C-7A Caribou
 Douglas A-26K Counter Invader
 Douglas C-47 Skytrain
 Douglas C-54 Skymaster
 Douglas C-118A Liftmaster
 Douglas C-124C Globemaster II
 Douglas C-133A Cargomaster
 Fairchild C-119G Flying Boxcar
 Fairchild C-123K Provider
 Grumman HU-16 Albatross
 Lockheed C-5A Galaxy
 Lockheed C-56 Lodestar
 Lockheed C-141B Starlifter
 Lockheed F-104A Starfighter
 Lockheed T-33 Shooting Star
 Lockheed VC-140 JetStar
 North American CT-39A Sabreliner
 North American F-86L Sabre
 North American F-100 Super Sabre
 McDonnell F-101B Voodoo
 McDonnell Douglas F-4C Phantom II
 Republic F-84F Thunderstreak

Aircraft indoors

Fairchild PT-19
Piper L-4
Stinson L-5 Sentinel
Vultee BT-13 Valiant
 Cessna O-2A Skymaster
Waco CG-4

Indoor exhibits

Basic trainers
This area of the museum covers training equipment and aircraft that have been involved with Travis Air Force Base throughout the years.  Museum artifacts include an F-100 simulator, T-37 simulator, BT-13 Valiant, and PT-19.

Early years
This area of the museum is an informational and educational dedication to the Wright Brothers, the founders of modern powered flight.

World War I
This exhibit highlights the 94th Aero Squadron and its service in France in 1918-1919 during World War I.  The exhibit also retains original copies of the Stars and Stripes newspaper from that era.

Inter-war years
The inter war exhibit is a dedication to peacetime flight in America between the World Wars.  It covers the 1927 Grand Canyon flights, Billy Mitchell's Bombers, the "Spirit of St. Louis", and a display of an AT-17 Bobcat trainer.

World War II
This section of the museum houses exhibits on the Flying Tigers, the Doolittle Raid, Women Airforce Service Pilots, a Fat Man atomic bomb, and two aircraft displays, a L-4 Grasshopper and Waco CG-4 glider.

Cold War
This museum exhibit is extensive, and covers the Berlin Airlift, early Strategic Air Command operations of the base, and miscellaneous information about the accomplishments of Travis airmen during that time.

Korean War
Travis Air Force Base played a large role in the Korean War.  The museum mirrors this with a display of a C-119 Flying Boxcar (outside), display of General Robert F. Travis's B-29 Superfortress crash artifacts, and information on how Travis Air Force Base became the "Gateway to the Pacific".

Vietnam War
This area of the museum covers operations of the time, such as Operation Homecoming.  There is also a dedication to Vietnam nurses.

Modern flight
The museum highlights the fact that Travis Air Force Base was the home of some significant modern aircraft.  There are displays on the C-141 Starlifter, C-5 Galaxy, strategic airlift, and aerial refueling.

Space exploration
This section of the museum houses dedications to the Mercury space program, the Gemini space program, and a display of an X-15 prototype rocket engine.

Humanitarian missions
This exhibit contains displays about various humanitarian missions throughout the years, including Operation Babylift, in which South Vietnamese orphans were flown out of Vietnam in 1975.

Misc. collections
The museum also houses many original pieces of art, various aircraft engines, both radial/reciprocating and turbine, an AGM-28 Hound Dog cruise missile, military uniforms, a military coin collection, and an extensive research library.

See also
Travis Air Force Base
 List of United States Air Force museums

References

External links

 

Aerospace museums in California
Military and war museums in California
Fairfield, California
Museums in Solano County, California